Keshcarrigan lough is a mesotrophic freshwater near Keshcarrigan village, in northwest Ireland. Known for quality coarse fishing, Keshcarrigan lough allows bank fishing from concrete stands on the northern shore, two with wheelchair access. The ecology of Keshcarrigan lough, and other Leitrim waterways, is threatened by curly waterweed, zebra mussel, and freshwater clam invasive species.

Etymology
The lake is named from the bordering townland of "Keshcarrigan", meaning the "".

Geography
Keshcarrigan lough lies due south of Keshcarrigan village and Lough Scur, in Kiltubrid parish, south County Leitrim in the northwest of Ireland. The level of Keshcarrigan lough is the same as Lough Scur, and a channel of about  connects both lakes. Keshcarrigan lough is bounded by the townlands of Keshcarrigan to the north, Clooney to the south, Laheen to the west, Carrick to the north, and Toomans to the east.

Ecology
Fish present in Keshcarrigan Lough include "roach-bream hybrids", Roach, Perch, Bream up to 4lbs, and Pike. The pike population is the "native Irish strain" ( meaning 'Irish Pike') not the other European Pike strain ( meaning 'strange or foreign fish').

Crayfish
A thriving population of White-clawed crayfish was reported here in 2009. Keshcarrigan lough, with a shallow rocky shore, has some ideal potential White-clawed crayfish habitat, but the ecology is seriously threatened by zebra mussel infestation, and indiscriminate importation of non-indigenous crayfish species.

Human settlement
The primary human settlement at Keshcarrigan lough is the village of Keshcarrigan.

See also
 List of loughs in Ireland
 Keshcarrigan

References

Citations

Sources

External links 

Keshcarrigan